The Net is a South Korean film directed by Kim Ki-duk. The film had its world premiere at the 2016 Toronto International Film Festival

Plot
Ryoo Seung-bum stars as Nam Chul-woo, a poor fisherman living a simple life in North Korea with his wife and daughter. One day his net gets caught in his engine, and he is suspected of being either a defector or a spy when his boat accidentally drifts into South Korean waters. He endures interrogation, beatings, and more in his attempt to return to his family, even as he comes to the realization that his life will never be the same.

Cast
Ryoo Seung-bum as Nam Chul-woo
Kim Young-min as Inspector
Lee Won-keun as Oh Jin-woo
Choi Gwi-hwa
Kim Su-an as North Korean flower girl

Awards and nominations

References

External links 
 The Net at the Internet Movie Database

South Korean drama films
Films directed by Kim Ki-duk
2016 films
2010s South Korean films